The 4th constituency of Réunion is a French legislative constituency on the island of Réunion.

As of 2022, it is represented by Emeline K/Bidi, a Le Progrès deputy.

Deputies

Election results

2022

2017

2012

Sources

 French Interior Ministry results website: 

4